Mark Henry (born 19 April 1981) is an Australian former professional rugby league footballer who played as  or er.

Background
Henry was born in the Australian Capital Territory.

Playing career
He joined Super League side the Salford City Reds for the 2009 season.

Point Scoring Summary - North Queensland Cowboys

References

External links
Salford City Reds profile
Player profile @ Cowboys.com.au
Henry @ rleague.com

1981 births
Living people
Australian rugby league players
North Queensland Cowboys players
Rugby league centres
Rugby league fullbacks
Rugby league locks
Rugby league players from Canberra
Rugby league wingers
Salford Red Devils players